Marc Clotet Fresquet (born 29 April 1980) is a Spanish actor and model. He is best known for his roles in the soap opera El Cor de la Ciutat and in the teen drama Física o Química.

Career
Born in Barcelona he has also worked as a model, most recently for the Spanish magazine Showdown.

Personal life
Clotet was married to Cuban-Spanish actress Ana de Armas from July 2011 to 2013. In 2013, he began dating actress Natalia Sánchez; they have a daughter, Lia, and a son, Neo.

Filmography

Film 
The Sleeping Voice (2011)
Gernika bajo las bombas (2012)
El jugador de ajedrez (2017)
 La Estrella (2013)

Television 
 Tocao del ala (1997)
 El cor de la ciutat (2007–2009) (Iago)
 El comisario (2008–2009) (Pau Montaner)
 Física o Química (2009 – 2011) (Vicente Vaquero)
 El Caso. Crónica de sucesos (2016) (Gerardo de Zabaleta)
 Morocco: Love In Times of War (2017) (Alejandro Prada)
 Poskad Dari Alhambra (2020)

References

External links
 
 
 Marc Clotet and Olympic medalist Gemma Mengual attend a fundraising event for Haiti in Barcelona.

1980 births
Male actors from Barcelona
Male television actors from Catalonia
Living people
People from Barcelona
Spanish male models
21st-century Spanish male actors